The Liudui Hakka Cultural Park is a cultural center in Neipu Township, Pingtung County, Taiwan about Hakka people.

History
The park was originally a tobacco barn area which was constructed in 1961. In 2009, the owner decided to donate the area and facilities. The area was then converted to Liudui Hakka Cultural Park and was opened on 22 October 2011.

Attractions
Liudui Hakka Cultural Parks has an area of 30 hectares, which contains several attractions:
 Hakka Settlement Architecture
 Nine Flowers Garden Area
 Seasonal Farmland Area
 Natural Prairie Area
 Hakka Ditch Area
 Auditorium
 Wooden Trail
 Headspring Plaza
 Wetland Garden
 Countryside Area
 Poolside Stage

Exhibition Hall
 Permanent Exhibition
 Permanent Exhibition - Hakkaland Children’s Museum
 Multimedia Exhibition Hall
 Tobacco Barn Exhibition Hall
 Rice Mill Exhibition Hall

Transportation
The park is accessible by bus from Pingtung Station of Taiwan Railways.

See also
 List of tourist attractions in Taiwan

References

External links
 

1961 establishments in Taiwan
Barns in Taiwan
Buildings and structures completed in 1961
Cultural centers in Pingtung County
Hakka culture in Taiwan